The 2019 Borno State gubernatorial election occurred on March 9, 2019, the APC nominee Babagana Umara Zulum won the election, defeating Mohammad Imam of the PDP.

Babagana Umara Zulum emerged APC gubernatorial candidate after scoring 4,432 votes and defeating his closest rival, Idris Durkwa, who received 115 votes. He picked Umar Usman Kadafur as his running mate. Mohammad Imam was the PDP candidate with Buba Haruna Biu as his running mate. 32 candidates contested in the election.

Electoral system
The Governor of Borno is elected using the plurality voting system.

Primary election

APC primary
The APC primary election was held on September 30, 2018. Babagana Umara Zulum won the primary election polling 4,432 votes against 9 other candidates. His closest rival was Idris Durkwa, who came a distant second with 115 votes, while Kashim Imam came third with 20 votes.

Candidates
Party nominee: Babagana Umara Zulum: former commissioner for reconstruction, rehabilitation and resettlement
Running mate: Umar Usman Kadafur
Idris Durkwa
Kashim Imam
Gambo Lawan
Atom Magira
Mustapha Shehuri
Baba Ahmed Jidda: Nigeria ambassador to China
Umara Kumalia
Umar Alkali
Abba Jato

PDP primary
The PDP primary election was held on September 30, 2018. Mohammad Iman won the primary election polling 2,785 votes against 2 other candidates. His closest rival was Kyari Abba Bukar came second with 52 votes, while Mohammed Wakil came third with 20 votes.

Candidates
Party nominee: Mohammad Imam
Running mate: Buba Haruna Biu
Kyari Abba Bukar
Mohammed Wakil

Results
A total number of 32 candidates registered with the Independent National Electoral Commission to contest in the election.

The total number of registered voters in the state was 2,316,218, while 1,292,138 voters were accredited. Total number of votes cast was 1,289,027, while number of valid votes was 1,266,967. Rejected votes were 22,060.

By local government area
Here are the results of the election by local government area for the two major parties. The total valid votes of 1,266,967 represents the 32 political parties that participated in the election.<span style=background:#87BEEB> Blue represents LGAs won by Babagana Umara Zulum. Green represents LGAs won by Mohammad Imam.

References 

Borno State gubernatorial election
Borno State gubernatorial election
Borno State gubernatorial elections